Mitchell William Sharp  (May 11, 1911 – March 19, 2004) was a Canadian politician and a Companion of the Order of Canada, most noted for his service as a Liberal Cabinet minister. He did, however, serve in both private and public sectors during his long career.

Background
Sharp was born in Winnipeg, Manitoba. He earned his Bachelor of Arts degree from the University of Manitoba in 1934 and completed post-graduate work at that university and then at the London School of Economics. During this time, he worked as a writer focusing on the grain trade.

Sharp started his long career in public service in 1947 when he was offered the job as the director of the Department of Finance's Economic Policy Division.  From 1951 to 1957, Sharp served as the Associate Deputy Minister of Trade and Commerce.  During his tenure, he was responsible for international trade relations.  Soon after, Sharp served a short term as the Deputy Minister of Trade and Commerce.

Politics
In 1963, Mitchell Sharp was elected as a member of Parliament (MP) representing Eglinton. Shortly thereafter, he was assigned the portfolio of Minister of Trade and Commerce.  From 1965 through 1968, Sharp was the Minister of Finance.  Other ministerial positions held include Secretary of State for External Affairs (1968–1974), President of the Privy Council (1974–1978) and Leader of the Government in the House of Commons (1974–1978).  Sharp resigned as a parliamentarian in 1978.

Sharp also disliked Canada's constitutional structure, revealing in his 1994 memoirs that because of his negative views on the monarchy, he refused to accept Prime Minister Pierre Trudeau's offer to recommend him for appointment as governor general. He also stated that "Canada should have its own head of state who isn't shared by others" and that the status quo gave the impression that "Canada had not yet achieved full independence from Britain."

Sharp's support was influential in securing a prominent position for the Canadian Pavilion at Expo 67 during the Canadian Centennial, which had initially been proposed to be much smaller, limited to a single acre.

After politics
Sharp re-entered the public sector as the commissioner of the Northern Pipeline Agency, an agency formed under the Northern Pipeline Act (1978) to give effect to the U.S.-Canada Agreement on Principles Applicable to a Northern Natural Gas Pipeline (1977), from 1978 until 1988.  His public service continued as he served as a co-chairman of a task force on conflict of interest and published a report on ethical conduct in the public service in 1984.  Other posts included head of the Canadian group and deputy chairman of the Trilateral Commission (1976–1986).  From 1988 through 1993, he served as a policy associate with Strategion.  He was a personal adviser to Prime Minister Jean Chrétien from 1993 to 2003, a job for which he was paid $1 a year.

On February 22, 2004, Sharp fell and broke his collarbone in his home. He was taken to Elizabeth Bruyere Health Centre (hospital), in Ottawa, where he was diagnosed with an aggressive form of prostate cancer; that disease claimed his life on March 19 of that year. He was 92. He is buried in Ottawa.

Honours
Mitchell Sharp was sworn in as a member of the Queen's Privy Council for Canada on 22 April 1963, giving him the honorific prefix The Honourable and the post-nominal letters "PC" for life.

Honorary Degrees
Michell Sharp received several honorary degrees in recognition of his service to Canada.

Honorary Degrees

Further reading

Archives 
There is a Mitchell Sharp fonds at Library and Archives Canada.

References

External links 
 
Order of Canada Citation

1911 births
2004 deaths
Alumni of the London School of Economics
Canadian economists
Canadian republicans
Canadian Ministers of Finance
Canadian Secretaries of State for External Affairs
Deaths from cancer in Ontario
Companions of the Order of Canada
Deaths from prostate cancer
Liberal Party of Canada MPs
Members of the House of Commons of Canada from Ontario
Members of the King's Privy Council for Canada
Members of the United Church of Canada
Politicians from Winnipeg
University of Manitoba alumni